Alen Taymurazovich Zaseyev (born 10 October 1988 in the Georgian SSR, Soviet Union) is a naturalized Ukrainian freestyle wrestler of Ossetian descent.

Career
He won both silver medals in the 2013 European Wrestling Championships in Tbilisi, Georgia and 2013 World Wrestling Championships in Budapest, Hungary. In 2016 European Wrestling Championships won bronze medal.

In May 2016, he was provisionally suspended due to use of meldonium. Later that decision was reverted.

References

External links
 
 Profile 1
 Profile 2

1988 births
Living people
Doping cases in wrestling
Naturalized citizens of Ukraine
Ukrainian male sport wrestlers
Wrestlers at the 2016 Summer Olympics
Ukrainian sportspeople in doping cases
World Wrestling Championships medalists